The 2021 FIM Moto3 World Championship was a part of the 73rd F.I.M. Road Racing World Championship season. Pedro Acosta secured the 2021 championship with one race left in the season, which was marred by the death of Jason Dupasquier during the second qualifying session of the Italian Grand Prix.

Teams and riders

All teams used series-specified Dunlop tyres.

Team changes 
 GasGas entered the championship with Aspar Team, who had previously used KTM motorcycles.
 Estrella Galicia 0,0 and Sky Racing Team VR46 withdrew from Moto3.
 Avintia Esponsorama Racing expanded to two riders.

Rider changes 
 Darryn Binder joined Petronas Sprinta Racing, replacing Khairul Idham Pawi. He is replaced by Kaito Toba.
 Jaume Masià joined Red Bull KTM Ajo.
 2020 Red Bull MotoGP Rookies Cup World Champion Pedro Acosta made his full season debut with Red Bull KTM Ajo.
 Raúl Fernández moves up to Moto2 with the same team.
 Andrea Migno joined Rivacold Snipers Team, replacing Celestino Vietti who moved up to Moto2 with the same team.
 Sergio García joined Aspar Team, replacing Albert Arenas who moved up to Moto2 with the same team.
 2020 FIM CEV Moto3 Junior World Champion Izan Guevara made his full season debut with Aspar Team, replacing Stefano Nepa.
 Ryusei Yamanaka joined CarXpert Prüstel GP, replacing Barry Baltus who moved up to Moto2 with NTS RW Racing GP.
 Andi Farid Izdihar joined Moto3 with Honda Team Asia, replacing Ai Ogura who moved up to Moto2 with the same team.

Mid-season changes
 Takuma Matsuyama replaced Yuki Kunii for the Italian round because of a broken collarbone.
 Jason Dupasquier died after an accident during the second qualifying session at the Italian Grand Prix.
 Elia Bartolini replaced Carlos Tatay for the Catalan and German rounds because of an injury.
 Daniel Holgado replaced Maximilian Kofler for the Catalan round because of a fractured vertebrae.
 Joel Kelso replaced Maximilian Kofler for the German round as he continued to recover from a fractured vertebrae.
 Filip Salač and Rivacold Snipers Team mutually ended their relationship following the German Grand Prix. He was replaced by Alberto Surra for the remainder of the season. Salač subsequently moved to CarXpert Prüstel GP to replace the late Jason Dupasquier, starting from the Styrian round.
 Xavier Artigas missed the Austrian round after testing positive for COVID-19 a week prior during the Styrian Grand Prix.
 Alberto Surra missed both Austria races due to physical problems and was replaced by David Salvador.
 Niccolò Antonelli missed the Austrian round after sustaining injuries during qualifying of the Styrian Grand Prix. He was replaced by Elia Bartolini.
 Andi Farid Izdihar missed the British round after having issues with his visa. He was not replaced.
 Syarifuddin Azman replaced John McPhee during the Aragon Grand Prix. McPhee served as a replacement in the Moto2 class for Jake Dixon, who in turn replaced the injured Franco Morbidelli in the MotoGP class.
 Gabriel Rodrigo missed the Americas and Emilia Romagna Grands Prix due to a shoulder injury sustained in a test. He was not replaced for both rounds.
 Deniz Öncü was given a double race ban for both the Emilia Romagna and the Algarve Grands Prix after causing an accident involving three riders during race 2 of the Americas Grand Prix. He was replaced by Daniel Holgado for both the Emilia Romagna and Algarve rounds.
 Sergio García missed the Emilia Romagna round after suffering a kidney hematoma from the a crash during a free practice session of the Americas round. He was replaced by David Alonso for the round.

Calendar 
The following Grands Prix took place in 2021:

Grand Prix locations

Calendar changes 
 The Finnish Grand Prix was due to be reintroduced to the calendar after a 38-year absence. The venue hosting the round was to be the new Kymi Ring, instead of the Tampere Circuit used in 1962 and 1963, or the Imatra Circuit which hosted the round until 1982. The Finnish Grand Prix had been included on the 2020 calendar, but the inaugural race was cancelled in response to the COVID-19 pandemic.
The Czech Republic Grand Prix was initially left off the provisional calendar, as the circuit requires mandatory resurfacing for safety compliance, and it was unclear if the necessary work could be completed in time for its typical schedule date in early August. The 11th round of the championship was therefore left open as provisionally pending. On 8 December 2020, Brno city councillors opted out of the 2021 calendar, citing financial difficulties due to the COVID-19 pandemic. It marked the first absence of a Grand Prix in Brno since 1992. The mayor of Brno hopes for the return of the championship in 2022.

Calendar changes as a reaction to COVID-19 pandemic 
With the uncertainty of the development of the COVID-19 pandemic, championship organizer Dorna elected in November 2020 to nominate three "Reserve Grand Prix Venues" which could be used in the event that local virus containment measures or regulations force the cancellation of a planned Grand Prix.
The Portuguese Grand Prix at Algarve had previously returned to the schedule as a replacement race for the final round of the COVID-19 shortened 2020 season.
The Indonesian Grand Prix was originally planned to be reintroduced to the main calendar after a 23-year absence before being designated a Reserve Grand Prix for 2021. The venue hosting the round would be the new Mandalika International Street Circuit, instead of the Sentul International Circuit used in 1996 and 1997.
A Russian Grand Prix would see the inaugural motorcycle Grand Prix in that country. The Igora Drive circuit would be used.
On 22 January 2021, Dorna significantly updated the provisional calendar including the following changes:
The Argentine and American Grands Prix would be postponed due to the COVID-19 situation in both countries, with potential rescheduling for the final quarter of 2021.
A double-header would open the season in Qatar on 28 March and 4 April, followed by Portugal as the third round.
The provisionally pending race created by the absence of the Czech Grand Prix was removed.
The potential Russian Grand Prix was removed from the reserve list, leaving Indonesia as the sole Reserve Grand Prix Venue.
On 14 May the Finnish Grand Prix was cancelled due to the COVID-19 situation, and the Styrian Grand Prix would replace it on the date of 8 August. It was also confirmed that the Indonesian Grand Prix would remain a reserve Grand Prix in the 2021 calendar, subject to circuit homologation.
On 23 June the Japanese Grand Prix was cancelled due to the COVID-19 situation, with the previously postponed Grand Prix of the Americas taking its place in the calendar. This also led to the postponement of the Thailand Grand Prix by one week.
On 6 July the Australian Grand Prix was cancelled due to the COVID-19 situation, with the Malaysian Grand Prix brought forward by a week to replace it on the date of 24 October. In addition, a new Grand Prix, the Algarve Grand Prix, was introduced, which is scheduled to be held on 7 November.
On 21 July the Thailand Grand Prix was cancelled due to the COVID-19 restrictions in the country.
On 19 August the Malaysian Grand Prix was cancelled due to the COVID-19 restrictions in the country. For its replacement, a second Grand Prix at Misano was introduced, having the same schedule as the cancelled Malaysian round.
On 11 September the final championship calendar comprising 18 Grands Prix was confirmed. The Emilia Romagna and Rimini Riviera Grand Prix returned as the second Grand Prix at Misano, now having the shortened name of Emilia Romagna motorcycle Grand Prix. The previously postponed Argentine Grand Prix was also cancelled.

Results and standings

Grands Prix

Riders' standings
Scoring system
Points were awarded to the top fifteen finishers. A rider had to finish the race to earn points.

Constructors' standings
Each constructor got the same number of points as their best placed rider in each race.

Teams' standings
The teams' standings were based on results obtained by regular and substitute riders; wild-card entries were ineligible.

Notes

References

Grand Prix motorcycle racing seasons